Ihor Serhiyovych Kiriyenko (born 5 March 1986) is a Ukrainian professional footballer who plays as a striker.

Playing career
Native of Nikopol, Kiriyenko is a product of its football school who played for Nikopol teams in the nation youth league in 1999–2002 (Kolos and Elektrometalurh).

In 2004–2007 he represented the top league Illichivets Mariupol (later FC Mariupol), but played mostly for its reserve teams.

Ihor Kiriyenko transferred to FC Kremin Kremenchuk during 2009 winter transfer window.

Most notable period of his career was in 2013–2016 when Kiriyenko was playing for Hirnyk-Sport Komsomolsk and scored 46 goals. In 2013–14 Ukrainian Second League he helped Hirnyk-Sport to win the Second League and was a runner-up on the top scorer list for the season with 27 tallies.

Dinaz Vyshhorod
On 19 March 2021, he scored two goals in the winning match against Chaika.

Olimpik Donetsk
In summer 2021 he moved to Olimpik Donetsk and he made his debut in Ukrainian First League scoring a goal in the season 2021–22 against Kryvbas Kryvyi Rih.

Shevardeni-1906 Tbilisi
In February 2022, he moved in Georgia to Shevardeni-1906 Tbilisi in Erovnuli Liga 2.

National Team
In 2003, he was called up to play for the 23-man squad of the Ukraine U17.

Career statistics

Club

International

Honours
Kremin Kremenchuk
 Ukrainian Second League: 2018–19

Desna Chernihiv
 Ukrainian First League: 2017–18

Hirnyk-Sport Komsomolsk
 Ukrainian Second League: 2013–14

Dinaz Vyshhorod
 Ukrainian Second League: Runner-Up 2020–21

Illichivets-2 Mariupol
 Ukrainian Second League: Runner-Up 2005–06

Elektrometalurh-NZF Nikopol
 Ukrainian Second League: Runner-Up 2003–04

Individual
 Best Player of Round 13 of Ukrainian Second League: 2020–21
 Best Player of Round 13 of Ukrainian First League: 2018–19
 Best Player of Round 21 of Ukrainian First League: 2018–19
 Top Scorer Ukrainian Second League: Runner-up 2013–14 (27 goals)

References

External links
 
 
 

1986 births
Living people
People from Nikopol, Ukraine
Ukrainian footballers
Ukraine youth international footballers
Association football forwards
FC Elektrometalurh-NZF Nikopol players
FC Enerhiya Yuzhnoukrainsk players
FC Kremin Kremenchuk players
FC Mariupol players
FC Illichivets-2 Mariupol players
FC Shakhtar Sverdlovsk players
FC Hirnyk-Sport Horishni Plavni players
FC Hirnyk Kryvyi Rih players
FC Desna Chernihiv players
FC Kramatorsk players
FC Dinaz Vyshhorod players
FC Olimpik Donetsk players
FC Shevardeni-1906 Tbilisi players
Ukrainian Premier League players
Ukrainian First League players
Ukrainian Second League players
Ukrainian Amateur Football Championship players
Expatriate footballers in Georgia (country)
Ukrainian expatriate sportspeople in Georgia (country)
Sportspeople from Dnipropetrovsk Oblast